The Gran City Pop Tour is the fourth solo concert tour by  Mexican pop and rock singer Paulina Rubio. The tour began in September  2009 in support of her ninth studio album Gran City Pop. The tour began in Primm, Nevada and ended in Medellín the following year."Gran City Pop tour" was considered her most successful tour to date; the tour visited over 13 countries in North America, South America and Europe. The last sold out concert was recorded at the Auditorio Nacional's 10,000+ crowd in Mexico's capital, Mexico CIty.

Critical response
The tour received positive reviews from the entertainment press. The website Elcomercioonline compared the show to Madonna's shows, assuring that it combines "her greatest hits with choreographies along with a corps de ballet and numerous costume changes."

Set list
This set list represents the 21 November 2009 show at the Auditorio Nacional in Mexico. It does not represent all dates throughout the tour.

 "Algo De Ti" 
 "Ni Una Sola Palabra"
 "Lo Haré Por Ti"
 "Todo Mi Amor"
 "Más Que Amigo"
 "Yo No Soy Esa Mujer"
 "El Último Adiós"
 "Dame Otro Tequila"
 "Ni Rosas Ni Juguetes"
 "Nada Puede Cambiarme"
 "Baila Casanova"
 "Mío" (duet with Jay de la Cueva from Moderatto) 
 "Algo Tienes"
 "Melodía De Tu Alma" 
 "Sabor A Miel" / "Enamorada" / "Amor De Mujer"
 "A Contraluz"
 "Don't Say Goodbye" 

Encore
 "Causa Y Efecto" 
 "Y Yo Sigo Aquí"
 "Te Quise Tanto"

Notes
 "Enséñame" was performed at US dates.

Tour dates

Cancelled shows

Personnel 
Andreas Geck – musical director, bass
Daniel Mandelman – keys
Benjamin Hazlett – guitar
David Salinas – bass
Mikey Pesante – background vocals
Melissa Garcia – background vocals

Credits:

References

External links
Paulina Rubio – Official Website
Paulina Rubio – Official Fan Club

2009 concert tours
2010 concert tours